Physica Status Solidi, often stylized physica status solidi or pss, is a family of international peer-reviewed, scientific journals, publishing research on all aspects of solid state physics, and materials science. It is owned and published by Wiley–VCH. These journals publish over 2000 articles per year, making it one of the largest international publications in condensed matter physics. The current editor in chief is Stefan Hildebrandt at the Editorial Office based in Berlin. This office also manages the peer-review process.

History 
Physica Status Solidi was founded by Karl Wolfgang Böer (then at Humboldt University of Berlin) in East Berlin and published its first issue in July 1961. Shortly after the journal was founded, the construction of the Berlin Wall in August 1961 exacerbated the distances between scientists from the Eastern and Western blocs. Throughout the cold war Physica Status Solidi maintained political independence and English as publication language and, as such, it became a major platform for the scientists behind the Iron Curtain to disseminate their results in the Western world (and vice versa) and thus a forum of international exchange for scientists from the East and the West.

In 1970 the journal was divided into series A (Applications and Materials Science) and B (Basic Solid State Physics). In 2003, series C (Current Topics in Solid State Physics) was created to accommodate the publication of conference proceedings.

Following the reunification of Germany in 1990 the journal's original publisher Akademie Verlag became part of the VCH Publishing group, which again was merged into John Wiley & Sons, leading to the formation of Wiley-VCH Verlag in 1997.

A fourth series, RRL (Rapid Research Letters), was launched in 2007 to publish short articles of broader and immediate interest to the solid state physics and materials science community. Publication times are typically two weeks from submission to online publication.

Journals

References

External links 
 Physica Status Solidi A
 Physica Status Solidi B
 Physica Status Solidi C
 Physica Status Solidi RRL

Physics journals
Materials science journals
Monthly journals
English-language journals
Publications established in 1961
Wiley (publisher) academic journals